Jacob L. Frey Tobacco Warehouse is a historic tobacco warehouse located at Lancaster, Lancaster County, Pennsylvania. It was built about 1870, and is a two-story, irregular brick building with a raised basement and gable front roof.  It is three bays wide and approximately 60 feet deep.

It was listed on the National Register of Historic Places in 1990.

References

Industrial buildings and structures on the National Register of Historic Places in Pennsylvania
Industrial buildings completed in 1870
Buildings and structures in Lancaster, Pennsylvania
Warehouses on the National Register of Historic Places
Tobacco buildings in the United States
National Register of Historic Places in Lancaster, Pennsylvania
1870 establishments in Pennsylvania